Cephalopholis is a genus of marine ray-finned fish, groupers from the subfamily Epinephelinae in the family Serranidae, which also includes the anthias and sea basses. Many of the species have the word "hind" as part of their common name in English.

Species
Cephalolophis contains the following 24 species:

 Cephalopholis aitha Randall & Heemstra, 1991 (Rusty hind)
 Cephalopholis argus Schneider, 1801 (Peacock hind)
 Cephalopholis aurantia (Valenciennes, 1828) (Golden hind)
 Cephalopholis boenak (Bloch, 1790) (Chocolate hind)
 Cephalopholis cruentata (Lacépède, 1802) (Graysby)
 Cephalopholis cyanostigma (Valenciennes, 1828) (Bluespotted hind)
 Cephalopholis formosa (Shaw, 1812) (Bluelined hind)
 Cephalopholis fulva (Linnaeus, 1758) (Coney)
 Cephalopholis hemistiktos (Rüppell, 1830) (Yellowfin hind)
 Cephalopholis igarashiensis Katayama, 1957 (Garish hind)
 Cephalopholis leopardus (Lacepède, 1801) (Leopard hind)
 Cephalopholis microprion (Bleeker, 1852) (Freckled hind)
 Cephalopholis miniata (Forsskål, 1775) (Coral hind)
 Cephalopholis nigri (Günther, 1859) (Nigri hind)
 Cephalopholis nigripinnis (Valenciennes, 1828) (Blackfin grouper)
 Cephalopholis oligosticta Randall & Ben-Tuvia, 1983 (Vermilion hind)
 Cephalopholis panamensis (Steindachner 1876) (Pacific graysby)
 Cephalopholis polleni (Bleeker, 1868) (Harlequin hind)
 Cephalopholis polyspila Randall & Satapoomin, 2000 
 Cephalopholis sexmaculata (Rüppell 1830) (Sixblotch hind)
 Cephalopholis sonnerati (Valenciennes 1828) (Tomato hind)
 Cephalopholis spiloparaea (Valenciennes 1828) (Strawberry hind)
 Cephalopholis taeniops (Valenciennes 1828) (Bluespotted seabass)
 Cephalopholis urodeta (Forster, 1801) (Darkfin hind)

Recent molecular analyses have challenged the placement of the redmouth grouper in the genus Aethaloperca, in a study based on five different genes this species fell within in the Cephalopholis clade, thus suggesting that the species should be included in this genus and referred to as Cephalopholis rogaa.

References

 
Epinephelini
Taxonomy articles created by Polbot